Carnival Evening (Swedish: Marknadsafton) is a 1948 Swedish comedy drama film directed by Ivar Johansson and starring Adolf Jahr, Emy Hagman and Sigge Fürst. It was shot at the Centrumateljéerna Studios in Stockholm. The film's sets were designed by the art director Bibi Lindström and P.A. Lundgren.

Synopsis
The farmer Magni plans to marry Teresia, but the maid Lovisa has her own plans for him.

Cast
 Adolf Jahr as 	Magni
 Emy Hagman as 	Lovisa
 Sigge Fürst as 	Rapp
 Rut Holm as 	Teresia
 John Ekman as 	Otto
 Carin Swensson as 	Karna
 Anna-Lisa Baude as 	Shop assistant in gold store 
 John W. Björling as 	Drunk 
 Arthur Fischer as 	Blind man 
 Hjördis Gille as 	Old lady 
 Eric Gustafson as 	Upset man
 Viktor Haak as Blacksmith 
 Nils Hultgren as 	Tailor
 Gösta Qvist as 	Jonas
 Bellan Roos as Lena 
 Lillie Wästfeldt as 	Old lady

References

Bibliography 
 Krawc, Alfred. International Directory of Cinematographers, Set- and Costume Designers in Film: Denmark, Finland, Norway, Sweden (from the beginnings to 1984). Saur, 1986.
 Qvist, Per Olov & von Bagh, Peter. Guide to the Cinema of Sweden and Finland. Greenwood Publishing Group, 2000.

External links 
 

1948 films
Swedish comedy films
1948 comedy films
1940s Swedish-language films
Films directed by Ivar Johansson
Swedish black-and-white films
Films based on works by Vilhelm Moberg
1940s Swedish films